Black Scorpion is a 1995 American superhero  comedy film directed by Jonathan Winfrey and starring Joan Severance as the eponymous costumed crime fighter.  Roger Corman was the executive producer, and it was originally released on the Showtime cable network as part of the Roger Corman Presents series.

The film concerns the comic book-style adventures of Darcy Walker, a police detective whose secret identity is the Black Scorpion, a  superhero vigilante for justice.  While the movie doesn't explicitly spell out whether she has any special powers or not, it is shown in multiple scenes, through use of an electrical charge, that she is being enhanced by the scorpion ring she wears, a gift from her late father.  Like Batman, she fights evildoers with a combination of martial arts, great agility and strength, and many technological devices, including a high-powered, specially equipped car.  Also like the Batman TV series of the 1960s, Black Scorpion is a work of camp, using deliberately exaggerated and unrealistic characters and events to comic effect.

Black Scorpion was followed by a 1997 sequel, Black Scorpion II: Aftershock.  In 2001, the Sci-Fi Channel aired a Black Scorpion TV series that starred Michelle Lintel in the title role.

Black Scorpion was turned into a comic-book series, published digitally by Devil's Due Digital.  There was also a one-off Legend of Isis / Black Scorpion comic published by Bluewater Productions.

Premise
Darcy Walker, a police detective, becomes the Black Scorpion, a costumed crime fighter, after her father is murdered.  She does not reveal her secret identity to her partner Michael Russo. She is aided by Argyle, a technology expert and former car thief.

Cast
 Joan Severance as Darcy Walker, the Black Scorpion
 Bruce Abbott as Michael Russo
 Garrett Morris as Argyle
 Rick Rossovich as Stan Walker
 Stephen Lee as Captain Strickland
 Terri J. Vaughn as Tender Lovin'
 Michael Wiseman as Hacksaw
 Brad Tatum as Razor
 Steven Kravitz as Slugger
 Darryl M. Bell as E-Z Street
 Casey Siemaszko as Dr. Goddard
 John Sanderford as Aldridge
 Matt Roe as Mayor Artie Worth
 Shane Powers as Specs (Cop #2)

Production
The film was based on an original idea by Corman, which he developed with writer Craig Nevius. "I wanted to do a female Superman-Spiderman-Batman," said Corman.

Roger Corman said he wanted an unknown to play the lead.
My demands were -- I felt -- not difficult in Hollywood. I wanted an actress who was beautiful and had a great figure. Because we economized on the amount of cloth we used in the costume... I wanted a tall actress. She does a lot of martial arts. I couldn't have a 5-foot-1 actress beating up all these big guys. So I wanted a tall, beautiful woman with a good figure, who was a good actress, but I wasn't looking for Meryl Streep, just a good actress. I figured this would be pretty easy in Hollywood. It turned out to be incredibly difficult. I've never seen so many beautiful bad actresses in my life.

Critical reception
TV Guide said, "The heroine of this 1995 Roger Corman Presents Showtime movie – the direct-to-video goddess Joan Severance – wears a black bustier, spike-heel thigh-high boots, a mask, and practically nothing else. This could very well have been the entire pitch that got this movie made. If that is all you're looking for, then Black Scorpion more than delivers.... The mood of the film swerves from straight-forward police noir themes to cartoony superhero action. Given the hackneyed dialogue, and Severance's wooden delivery of it, the best thing about this film just might be its beautifully haunting theme music."

In DVD Talk, Scott Weinberg wrote, "Black Scorpion is a scrappy, silly, low-budget Batman Returns rip-off that freely admits that it's a scrappy, silly, rip-off. That alone doesn't make it a good expenditure of one's time, but it's nice to see a campy little schlock-fest that at least respects the movies it's stealing from.... For what it is, which is a downright ridiculous take on the super-hero schpiel, Black Scorpion is actually pretty entertaining. And for all its broad (and periodically inane) silliness, it's a B-flick that delivers what it promises, with a whole lotta Severance on the side."

In Cinema on the Rocks, Ziggy Berkeley said, "What's not a distraction, amazingly enough, is the script.  As it turns out, it's not just the fact that Black Scorpion is a comic-book heroine movie that makes it easy to ignore the plot holes and improbabilities.  It's also that the rest of the story is so solid.  Lines like the above-noted science problem are actually self-aware; generally, the dialogue's great, even sharp.  The humor/drama train is ridden with wonderful precision.  The pace is perfect.  Bottom line, Black Scorpion is fun.  But it's not just fun; it's well-crafted fun.  Pick it up.  You won't be sorry."

In Cinema Crazed, Felix Vasquez wrote, "While no one will ever claim Black Scorpion is a masterpiece of contemporary action film-making, it sure is a lot of fun and has that fun at the charge of Joan Severance, who is leggy, busty, and absolutely enticing when dressed as her rogue character.... Black Scorpion is admittedly a cheesy and absolutely campy hero origin tale that takes advantage of the C grade special effects and acting from the cast and delivers a romp that is something quite satisfying to sit through and never goes too over the top."

Sequel

Black Scorpion II, also known as Black Scorpion II: Aftershock and Black Scorpion II: Ground Zero was released in 1997.
Black Scorpion (TV series) aired for one season in 2001

References

External links

Black Scorpion comic book from Devil's Due Digital.
Black Scorpion at Letterbox DVD

1995 television films
1995 films
1995 action comedy films
1990s American films
1990s English-language films
1990s superhero comedy films
1990s vigilante films
Action television films
American comedy television films
American superhero comedy films
American vigilante films
Films directed by Jonathan Winfrey
Films scored by Kevin Kiner
Showtime (TV network) films
Superheroine films